The Comic Strip is an American animated series that features four rotating cartoon segments: The Mini-Monsters, Street Frogs, Karate Kat and TigerSharks. The 90-minute series ran in first-run syndication during the 1987 season.

This was the last TV series produced by Rankin/Bass Productions, and distributed by Lorimar-Telepictures.

Segments
Two segments were shown on each broadcast where they each ran for about 10 minutes. The four segments offered were:

The Mini-Monsters
A segment where normal human twin siblings Sherman (voiced by Seth Green) and Melissa find themselves in for a surprise when they are sent to summer camp for one year. Camp Mini-Mon turns out to be run by an organ playing shadowy camp director (voiced by Peter Newman), and attended by monster kids who are offspring of usually famous monsters, a witch, and Merlin. They are Count Dracula's son Dracky, Frankenstein's son Franky, The Wolf Man's son Wolfie, The Creature from the Black Lagoon's son Lagoon, The Mummy's son Mummo, the Invisible Man's son Blanko, Klutz (who may or may not be Godzilla's son), Jynx the Witch (voiced by Maggie Wheeler), and Merlin's son Melvin accompanied by Cawfield the talking crow (voiced by Earl Hammond). In addition, the camp director is assisted by the grandson of Dr. Jekyll and Mr. Hyde (voiced by Earl Hammond) who works as the camp's physician.

Street Frogs
A segment depicting the typical teen-aged hijinks of a gang of street-smart frogs named Big Max (voiced by Bob McFadden), Spider, Moose The Loose, "Honey Love" Loretta (voiced by Tanya Willoughby), and Dr. Slick. They are also on good terms with a turtle named Snappy Sam (voiced by Ron Taylor) who runs the diner that Loretta works at. Apart from Rankin-Bass regular Bob McFadden, this segment featured an African-American cast. Ron Taylor also provides the theme song vocals for this segment. Each episode contains a musical number.

Karate Kat
In a world inhabited by anthropomorphic cats, a private investigator cat (voiced by Bob McFadden) uses his karate to fight crime in his town which is usually in the form of gang leader Big Papa and his two lackeys named Boom-Boom Burmese (voiced by Larry Kenney) and Sumo Sai. When working at for McClaws's Detective Agency run by his boss Katie "Big Mama" McClaw (voiced by Gerrianne Raphael), Karate Kat is assisted by his friends/co-workers like inventor Dr. Katmandu (voiced by Larry Kenney), Chow-Baby and her sister Meow-Baby (voiced by Maggie Jacobsen), his overweight sparring partner Katgut, and the aptly named Katatonic.

TigerSharks

A group of powered-up human/sea animal hybrids consisting of Mako (voiced by Peter Newman), Walro (voiced by Earl Hammond), Dolph (voiced by Larry Kenney), Octavia (voiced by Camille Bonora), Lorca, Bronc, Angel, and Gupp become involved in underwater adventures that has them facing off against villains like T-Ray and Captain Bizzarly. Each episode consisted of two parts.

Episodes

Foreign syndication
The show was also seen on ABC Television in Australia, on RPN-9 in the Philippines, on RTM 1 in Malaysia (where it was shown after the long running American children's educational series Sesame Street), on Fun Channel in The Middle East, on TV 4 in Trinidad and Tobago, on ATV in Hong Kong (as part of their children's television strand called Tube Time), on TVJ in Jamaica and on Rai 2 in Italy.

Video releases
VHS releases of certain episodes of The Comic Strip were made available in 1987. These VHS tapes each featured three installments of one particular cartoon. For example, the video "Adventures at Camp Mini-Mon" contained three episodes: "Camp Mini-Mon The First Day", "The Belly Ache" and "Alien."

References

External links
 
 

1987 American television series debuts
1987 American television series endings
1980s American animated television series
1980s American anthology television series
American children's animated anthology television series
English-language television shows
First-run syndicated television programs in the United States
Animated television series about cats
Animated television series about frogs
Television series by Lorimar Television
Television series by Warner Bros. Television Studios
Rankin/Bass Productions television series
Television series by Lorimar-Telepictures